The Peru poison frog (Ameerega petersi), also known as Peruvian poison frog, Peruvian poison-arrow frog and emerald poison frog, is a species of frog in the family Dendrobatidae. It is found in eastern Peru (Ucayali River and Huallaga River basins) and western Brazil (Acre state). Its natural habitats are primary premontane and subtropical or tropical moist lowland forests, rivers, freshwater marshes, and intermittent freshwater marshes.

References

Ameerega
Amphibians of Brazil
Amphibians of Peru
Amphibians described in 1976
Taxonomy articles created by Polbot